Wonderland is the debut studio album by English synth-pop duo Erasure, released on 1 May 1986 by Sire Records in the United States and on 2 June 1986 by Mute Records in the United Kingdom and Germany. Not an immediate success, the three singles released from it failed to crack the top 40 in the UK. "Who Needs Love Like That" would eventually make the UK top 10 in 1992, and "Oh L'amour" reached the UK top 20 in 2003, both in remixed form promoting their Pop! The First 20 Hits and Hits! compilations respectively. However, the album fared better in both Germany and Sweden, where it charted within the top 20.

Erasure's initial exposure in the US came via dance clubs, as two singles reached the top 10 on Billboard Hot Dance Music/Club Play chart.

At the time of its release, Wonderland was considered a failure, especially when comparing it to Clarke's prior successes with Depeche Mode and Yazoo. Andy Bell has stated that Alison Moyet was an influence of his vocals and he used to practice to Yazoo songs.

Track listing
All songs were written by Andy Bell and Vince Clarke, except where noted.

UK and Germany releases (Mute)

Side one
"Who Needs Love Like That" (Clarke)
"Reunion"
"Cry So Easy" (Bell)
"Push Me Shove Me" (Clarke)
"Heavenly Action"

Side two
"Say What"
"Love is a Loser"
"Senseless"
"My Heart... So Blue" (Clarke)
"Oh L'amour"
"Pistol"

CD bonus tracks
"Say What" (remix)
"March on Down the Line" (remix)
"Senseless" (remix)

US release (Sire)

Side one
"Who Needs Love Like That" (Vince Clarke) - 3:19
"Reunion" - 3:25
"Cry So Easy" (Andy Bell) - 3:35
"Senseless" - 5:20
"Heavenly Action" - 3:30

Side two
"Say What" - 3:56
"Love is a Loser" - 3:02
"March on Down the Line" - 3:26
"My Heart... So Blue" (Clarke) - 4:31
"Oh L'amour" - 3:24

CD bonus tracks
"Who Needs Love Like That (The Love That Mix Version)" - 6:11
"Oh L'amour (The Funky Sisters Remix)" - 7:17

The US version drops the tracks "Push Me Shove Me" and "Pistol" and adds "March on Down the Line" which was originally the B-side to "Oh L'amour" in the UK (and also appeared in a remixed form as a CD bonus track on the UK version of the album). The CD versions of both the UK and US versions of the album have different remixes as bonus tracks.

The UK and US album versions of "Oh L'amour" were slightly different.
The Brazilian edition of the album contains the live version of "Oh L'amour" as track 6.

2011 remaster and repackage
On 4 July 2011, EMI re-released Erasure's first two albums in 2CD/DVD format. Both feature the original album remastered, plus another disc of tracks associated with the album, and a DVD containing promo videos and a live concert.

2016 "Erasure 30" 30th Anniversary BMG Reissue LP
Subsequent to their acquisition of Erasure's back catalog, and in anticipation of the band's 30th anniversary, BMG records commissioned reissues of all previously released UK editions of Erasure albums up to and including 2007's Light at the End of the World. All titles were pressed and distributed by Play It Again Sam on 180-gram vinyl and shrinkwrapped with a custom anniversary sticker.

2016 "30th Anniversary Edition" US Audiophile Remaster LP
In December 2016, American boutique record label Intervention Records released an audiophile-quality analogue remaster of the US release sourced from Sire's masters still held by Warner Brothers Records in the US. The release was pressed on 180-gram vinyl and in a 60s-style Tip-On jacket.

Intervention also planned and begun work on a similar release of Erasure's second album, The Circus, for the first quarter of 2017, but it was withdrawn in February of that year.

Charts

Release history

References

1986 debut albums
Albums produced by Flood (producer)
Erasure albums
Mute Records albums
Sire Records albums